The National Tactical Response Group (NTRG) is a specialist unit of His Majesty's Prison Service  in the United Kingdom, who work alongside National Dog & Technical Support Group (NDTSG) that is equipped to respond to serious incidents in prisons, in particular protests and hostage taking incidents.

Deployments of the NDTSG and NTRG are overseen at a national management level, and where escalation from localised 'Tornado Teams' is deemed appropriate.

In 2018, the unit was deployed 640 times to prisons across England and Wales.

References

External links 
 Parliamentary question relating to the National Tactical Response Group

Penal system in the United Kingdom
Ministry of Justice (United Kingdom)